Pettisville Local School District is a public school district in Pettisville, Ohio, United States.

Schools 
 Pettisville High School
 Pettisville Elementary

References

External links 
 

School districts in Ohio
Education in Fulton County, Ohio